Radłowo may refer to the following places:
Radłowo, Greater Poland Voivodeship (west-central Poland)
Radłowo, Kuyavian-Pomeranian Voivodeship (north-central Poland)
Radłowo, West Pomeranian Voivodeship (north-west Poland)